This is a list of cases reported in volume 308 of United States Reports, decided by the Supreme Court of the United States in 1939 and 1940.

Justices of the Supreme Court at the time of volume 308 U.S. 

The Supreme Court is established by Article III, Section 1 of the Constitution of the United States, which says: "The judicial Power of the United States, shall be vested in one supreme Court . . .". The size of the Court is not specified; the Constitution leaves it to Congress to set the number of justices. Under the Judiciary Act of 1789 Congress originally fixed the number of justices at six (one chief justice and five associate justices). Since 1789 Congress has varied the size of the Court from six to seven, nine, ten, and back to nine justices (always including one chief justice).

When the cases in volume 308 were decided the Court comprised the following members (Justice Butler died in the midst of the time-period covered by volume 308):

Notable Case in 308 U.S.

Schneider v. State (Town of Irvington)
Schneider v. State (Town of Irvington),   308 U.S. 147 (1939), was a decision that combined four similar appeals (Schneider v. State (Town of Irvington), Young v. California, Snyder v. City of Milwaukee, and Nichols v. Massachusetts), each of which presented the question whether municipal ordinances abridged the First Amendment rights of freedom of speech and of the press secured against state invasion by the Fourteenth Amendment of the Constitution. The appellants (Jehovah's Witnesses) were charged with violating ordinances barring persons from distributing handbills on public streets or handing them out door-to-door. The Supreme Court held that the purpose of the ordinances (to keep the streets clean and of good appearance) was insufficient to justify prohibiting the appellants from handing out literature to other persons willing to receive it.

Federal court system 

Under the Judiciary Act of 1789 the federal court structure at the time comprised District Courts, which had general trial jurisdiction; Circuit Courts, which had mixed trial and appellate (from the US District Courts) jurisdiction; and the United States Supreme Court, which had appellate jurisdiction over the federal District and Circuit courts—and for certain issues over state courts. The Supreme Court also had limited original jurisdiction (i.e., in which cases could be filed directly with the Supreme Court without first having been heard by a lower federal or state court). There were one or more federal District Courts and/or Circuit Courts in each state, territory, or other geographical region.

The Judiciary Act of 1891 created the United States Courts of Appeals and reassigned the jurisdiction of most routine appeals from the district and circuit courts to these appellate courts. The Act created nine new courts that were originally known as the "United States Circuit Courts of Appeals." The new courts had jurisdiction over most appeals of lower court decisions. The Supreme Court could review either legal issues that a court of appeals certified or decisions of court of appeals by writ of certiorari. On January 1, 1912, the effective date of the Judicial Code of 1911, the old Circuit Courts were abolished, with their remaining trial court jurisdiction transferred to the U.S. District Courts.

List of cases in volume 308 U.S. 

[a] Butler took no part in the case
[b] Stone took no part in the case
[c] Reed took no part in the case
[d] McReynolds took no part in the case

Notes and references

External links
  Case reports in volume 308 from Library of Congress
  Case reports in volume 308 from Court Listener
  Case reports in volume 308 from the Caselaw Access Project of Harvard Law School
  Case reports in volume 308 from Google Scholar
  Case reports in volume 308 from Justia
  Case reports in volume 308 from Open Jurist
 Website of the United States Supreme Court
 United States Courts website about the Supreme Court
 National Archives, Records of the Supreme Court of the United States
 American Bar Association, How Does the Supreme Court Work?
 The Supreme Court Historical Society